"Limelight" is the 12th single by the French singer Alizée, released in 2010. The single is an electro-pop. "Limelight" was used as a teaser song for the upcoming album Une enfant du siècle. The music and the lyrics are by Angy Laperdrix, Guillaume de Maria, Julien Galinier and Raphael Vialla. The single was only on sale in Poland.

Format
The vinyl single has on its B-side the long version of the song and the A-side has a picture.

Video
Official music video of the song was never released. Only a teaser video exists.

Credits
Artwork by Partel Oliva
Photography by Camille Vivier
Composed by Angy Laperdrix, Guillaume de Maria, Julien Galinier and Raphael Vialla
Written by Angy Laperdrix, Guillaume de Maria, Julien Galinier and Raphael Vialla

References

2010 singles
Alizée songs
2010 songs
Jive Records singles